Qaemiyeh (also Romanized as Qā’emīyeh) is a city and capital of Kuh-Chenar County, in Fars Province, Iran.  At the 2006 census, its population was 23,734, in 5,054 families.   It is a junction of Road 86 and Road 55

References

Populated places in Chenar Shahijan County
Cities in Fars Province